The 2022 Florida Atlantic Owls baseball team represented Florida Atlantic University in the sport of baseball for the 2022 college baseball season. The Owls competed in Division I of the National Collegiate Athletic Association (NCAA) and Conference USA. They played their home games at FAU Baseball Stadium, on the university's Boca Raton campus. The team was coached by John McCormack, who was in his fourteenth season at Florida Atlantic.

Previous season

The 2021 Owls finished 35–25 overall, and 18–14 in the conference. They lost to Old Dominion during the 2021 Conference USA baseball tournament.

Preseason

C-USA media poll
The Conference USA preseason poll was released on February 16, 2022, with the Owls predicted to finish in fifth place.

Preseason All-CUSA teams
Hunter Cooley – Starting Pitcher

Personnel

Schedule and results

Schedule Source:

Rankings

Awards

References

External links
•	FAU Baseball

Florida Atlantic
Florida Atlantic Owls baseball seasons
Florida Atlantic Owls baseball